Moving Targets may refer to:

Moving Targets (Flo & Eddie album), album by Flo & Eddie
Moving Targets (Penetration album), album by Penetration
Moving Targets (film), 2004 Hong Kong action film
Moving Targets (band), American alternative rock band

See also
Moving Target (disambiguation)